Xuzhou No. 5 High School is a public secondary school in Xuzhou, Jiangsu, China, established in 1905.

History
The private Peixin Academy (培心书院) was established in 1905 as a missionary school. It was renamed as Peixin middle school, or Peizheng middle school. In 1952, the Xuzhou government took it over and named it Xuzhou No. 5 Middle School of Shandong Province. In 1953, because Xuzhou was put under Jiangsu province, the name is changed into Xuzhou Number 5 Middle School.

Today
Xuzhou No. 5 Middle School now is a three-star high school. Instruction includes classes of lyre-playing, chess, calligraphy and painting, a 21-or 25-stringed plucked instrument, I-go, manners, poetry and other classes with strong ethnic characteristics which contribute to inheriting and developing Chinese traditional culture. Small class teaching has been implemented in Xuzhou Number 5 Middle School.

Facilities
The campus is about 31,000 square metres. The building area is 13,885 square meters.
There are laboratory building, office building, peizheng building, wusan building, teaching buildings, and history museum building.

Laboratory building
In the laboratory building, there is a theatre classroom with multi-media facilities which is equipped with 3oo seats. Besides this, there are 3 physics Labs, 2 Chemistry labs, 2 Biology labs, 1 labor and technology classroom. The fourth floor and fifth floor are usually used for music teaching, dancing teaching art teaching and varied activities.
Teaching buildings
At present, Xuzhou Number 5 middle school has a total of 46 classrooms, which includes 24 senior high school classrooms and 22 junior high school classrooms and make up 3 teaching buildings. All of the three buildings are allocated with screens, slide projectors, recording machines, and video cassette recorders. 
Library
In the library, there are about 8,3714 books, more than 7,0000 books of them have been put into computers. Students can read books in different fields.

Teaching staff
Nowadays, the staff total 195. Among them, there are 164 part-time teachers, 43 senior teachers, 85 elementary teachers.
Most of the teachers are dedicated, careful and hardworking in teaching, as a result, a few dozens of them win the title of "famous teachers".
what's more, 16 teachers have been named as a provincial and municipal outstanding teachers.

Notable alumni
Ma Ke, musician
Zhu Rui, artillery commander of the People's Liberation Army (PLA)
Hu Xiuying, botanist
Wang Hailong, a scholar at Columbia University
Chen Zhong (professor), a president of  College of Software in Peking University
Cai Kailin, an assistant director of city National People's Congress
Hu Zhenglong, a deputy secretary of municipal party committee of Xuzhou

References

Schools in Jiangsu